Matthew Brian Greenfield (born January 12, 1965) is an American producer, scriptwriter, director and voice actor best known for his work in producing the English-language versions of many popular Japanese anime, most notably Neon Genesis Evangelion, and for being the co-founder of A.D. Vision.

Early life

Matthew Brian Greenfield was born on January 12, 1965, in Sacramento, California to Patricia (née Doering, born 1938) and Virgil Greenfield (1934–2006). His grandparents, Esther (née Weaver, 1917–2013) and Joseph Doering (1906–1975), worked at jewelry shops in Los Angeles; Esther was also a longtime member of the Shasta Dam Methodist Church (now known as the Shasta Lake Community United Methodist Church).

Career

Originally an avid fan who ran an anime club in Houston, Texas (known as "Anime NASA") starting in 1985 alongside classmate and AD Vision founder David Williams, Greenfield and Williams met fellow enthusiast John Ledford in 1992 and the three quickly formed AD Vision, a name later condensed to ADV Films. The company, which began as an importer of anime, marketing primarily to the existing network of anime fans, rapidly expanded and soon had its own dedicated dubbing studios and a distribution network that also handled international marketing, licensing and North American home video distribution for a wide variety of other programming, including non-ADV produced animated titles such as Sailor Moon, Robotech, Hello Kitty and ReBoot, and a diverse lineup of live action programming that ranged from Japanese horror and kaiju productions such as Gamera: Guardian of the Universe, Daimajin and the all-time Godzilla classic Destroy All Monsters.

Still growing, ADV also launched the first all anime television channel, The Anime Network, and a publishing division that distributed the authorized English version of the popular Japanese magazine Newtype and Japanese manga.

During a nearly 17-year period, Greenfield served first as ADV's general manager, then as a vice president of the company, and was involved with the majority of the company's releases, either as producer or executive producer, until 2009, when ADV ceased actively acquiring new media. By that time, Greenfield had already stepped into place as the front person for two new companies: Switchblade Pictures, which specializes in Japanese live-action exploitation films, and Maiden Japan, an animation label that began operations with the faux ecchi anime, Papillon Rose.

He continues to write and produce English dubs for new companies and distributors such as Sentai Filmworks and Section23 Films via post-production house/dubbing studio Seraphim Digital.

Greenfield has also worked as a voice actor, often going by the pseudonym Brian Granveldt.

He married voice actress Tiffany Grant in 2003. Greenfield is a frequent guest at anime and sci-fi conventions around the world, where he speaks on both the history and future of animation.

References

External links
 
 
 

American television directors
American television producers
American male voice actors
ADV Films
Living people
1961 births
American television writers
American male screenwriters
American male television writers
American voice directors